Glyphodes parallelalis is a moth of the family Crambidae. It was described by Max Gaede in 1917 and it is native to Togo.

This species has a wingspan of 21 mm and its colouration is similar to Glyphodes xanthostola Hampson, 1910.

References

Moths described in 1917
Glyphodes